Darrouzett Independent School District is a public school district based in Darrouzett, Texas (USA).

The district has one school.  Prior to the 2006–2007 school year the district school operated only through Grade 6 (though at one time prior it operated through Grade 12).  In the 2006–2007 school year the district reintroduced Grades 7–8, and since then has once again established itself as a K-12 school district.

Academic achievement
In 2009, the school district was rated "recognized" by the Texas Education Agency.

Special programs

Athletics
Darrouzett High School competes in basketball, track, cross country, tennis and golf.

See also

List of school districts in Texas

References

External links

School districts in Lipscomb County, Texas